is a railway station in the city of Obama, Fukui Prefecture, Japan, operated by West Japan Railway Company (JR West).

Lines

Station layout
The station consists of one side platform serving a single bi-directional track. The station is staffed.

Adjacent stations

History
Kato Station opened on 3 April 1921.  With the privatization of Japanese National Railways (JNR) on 1 April 1987, the station came under the control of JR West. The station building was rebuilt in 1995.

Passenger statistics
In fiscal 2016, the station was used by an average of 76 passengers daily (boarding passengers only).

Surrounding area

See also
 List of railway stations in Japan

Reference

External links

  

Railway stations in Fukui Prefecture
Stations of West Japan Railway Company
Railway stations in Japan opened in 1921
Obama Line
Obama, Fukui